The East Ridge Historical Area of UMass Amherst consists of several of the older lecture halls on campus, primarily those used by the entomology, plant pathology and other natural science programs. These buildings were originally located adjacent to the campus orchard where the Central Residential Area currently stands today. The district consists mainly of lecture halls that were built prior to the First World War by the Massachusetts Agricultural College; however, it is also home to the Boltwood-Stockbridge House, the oldest house in Amherst.

Historic buildings
 Apiary Laboratory
 Boltwood-Stockbridge House
 Clark Hall
 Fernald Hall
 French Hall
 French Hall Greenhouse
 Homestead House
 Wilder Hall

Other buildings
 Durfee Conservatory
 Franklin Dining Commons
 Hills Hall
 Morrill Science Center
 Studio Arts Building

Former buildings
 Fisher Laboratory
 Insectary
 Marshall Hall
 Marshall Hall Annex

References

External links
 2007 Legacy Buildings Report

University of Massachusetts Amherst buildings